Revich is a surname, that may refer to
Yury Revich, a classical violinist from Russia
S. J. Revich, an author from Canada